Entente Sportive La Rochelle, commonly known as ES La Rochelle, is a French association football club based in the commune of La Rochelle in the Charente-Maritime department, western France. The club was founded in 1904 and the senior team currently plays in the Division d'Honneur Centre-Ouest, the sixth tier of the French football league system. During the early 1970s La Rochelle played two seasons in Division 2; in 1971–72 and again in 1973–74.

Honours
 Division 3 Group Sud-Ouest: 1970–71
 Division 4 Group G: 1985–86
 Division d'Honneur Centre-Ouest: 1969–70, 1995–96

References

External links
 Official website

Association football clubs established in 1904
ES La Rochelle
ES La Rochelle
Football clubs in Nouvelle-Aquitaine